William Ernest "Ernie" Campbell (born 20 October 1949) is a former association football forward. He was a member of the Australian 1974 World Cup squad in West Germany and represented Australia 24 times between 1971 and 1975 and scored 3 goals.

Born in Sydney, Australia, Campbell started playing football as a junior in Sydney and was spotted by scouts from English club Chelsea in 1965 in an under 16 junior curtain raiser and accepted a one-season offer from Chelsea F.C. He later returned to Sydney to join APIA and then Marconi Stallions, playing in the NSL with Marconi Stallions, Sydney City and St George, He won NSW honours in 1974 and made his international debut against Israel in November 1971 in Melbourne.

References

1949 births
Living people
Soccer players from Sydney
Australia international soccer players
1974 FIFA World Cup players
National Soccer League (Australia) players
Marconi Stallions FC players
APIA Leichhardt FC players
Association football forwards
Australian soccer players
Australian expatriate sportspeople in England